Lewis Sperry (January 23, 1848 – June 22, 1922) was a United States representative from Connecticut. He was born at East Windsor Hill, South Windsor, Connecticut. He attended the district school and Monson Academy, Monson, Massachusetts and was graduated from Amherst College, Massachusetts in 1873. He studied law and was admitted to the bar in March 1875 and commenced practice in Hartford, Connecticut.

Sperry was a member of the Connecticut House of Representatives in 1876. Later, he was elected as a Democrat to the Fifty-second and Fifty-third Congresses (March 4, 1891 - March 3, 1895). He was an unsuccessful candidate for reelection in 1894 to the Fifty-fourth Congress. After Congress, he again resumed the practice of his profession in Hartford, Connecticut. He died at East Windsor Hill, town of South Windsor, Connecticut in 1922 and was buried in South Windsor Cemetery.

References

1848 births
1922 deaths
Democratic Party members of the Connecticut House of Representatives
Amherst College alumni
Democratic Party members of the United States House of Representatives from Connecticut
Politicians from Hartford, Connecticut
People from South Windsor, Connecticut